German submarine U-5269 was a Type XXVIIB "Seehund" midget submarine which bears one of the highest registry numbers of the Kriegsmarine to be issued to a submarine during World War II.  U-5269 was not, however, the last German submarine commissioned (that boat was U-4712) but was issued a higher registry since contracted boats were frequently commissioned out of order due to scheduling and construction conflicts.

As with the majority of the German mini-submarines of late World War II, U-5269 was part of the "wonder weapon" effort of Nazi Germany in an attempt to stem the defeats of 1944 and 1945.  Karl Dönitz had originally hoped for over one thousand miniature submarines to be constructed, but in the end the total number commissioned were just under three hundred.  The vessel is thought to have operated during the winter of 1944 and either scrapped or sunk in early 1945

References

U-boats commissioned in 1944
World War II submarines of Germany
1944 ships
Midget submarines
Type XXVII submarines